Vatican agreements may refer to:

 Concordat
 Treaties between the Republic of Croatia and the Holy See